The Biathlon events have been contested at the Universiade as optional sport at the 1983,1989 and 1993,becoming  a compulsory sport after the 1997.

Editions

Events

Medalists

Men

Individual 20 km

Sprint 10 km

Pursuit 12,5 km

Mass start 15 km

Relay 4 x 7,5 km

Women

Individual 15 km

Sprint 7,5 km

Pursuit 10 km

Mass start 12,5 km

Relay 4 x 6 km

Mixed

Relay 2 x 6 km / 2 x 7,5 km

Medal table 
Last updated after the 2023 Winter Universiade

References 
Sports123

 
Universiade
Sports at the Winter Universiade